Utricularia dimorphantha is a medium-sized suspended aquatic carnivorous plant that belongs to the genus Utricularia (family Lentibulariaceae). It is a perennial plant. It is endemic to Japan.

See also 
 List of Utricularia species

References

External links 

Carnivorous plants of Asia
Flora of Japan
dimorphantha